Paphinia seegeri is a species of orchid endemic to Colombia.

Taxonomy 
The classification of this orchid species was published by Dr. Günter Gerlach in Die Orchidee Dr. Gerlach is a noted expert on the genus Coryanthes.

References

External links 

seegeri
Endemic orchids of Colombia